Fakhar-un-Nisa Khokhar is a Pakistani politician who served as member of the National Assembly of Pakistan.

Political career
She was elected to the National Assembly of Pakistan as a candidate of Pakistan Peoples Party on a seat reserved for women from Punjab in the 2008 Pakistani general election.

References

Pakistani MNAs 2008–2013